The Midland Railway 690 Class was a class of six 0-4-4T built by Beyer, Peacock and Company in 1869 for use in the London area.

They were double-framed Kirtley engines with a back tank, i.e. the tank was placed beneath the bunker. The 780 Class was similar.

Their original numbers were 690–695.  In 1898 they were transferred to the duplicate list as 690A–695A. Their 1907 numbers were 1200–1205.  All were inherited by the London, Midland and Scottish Railway in 1923.  In 1930 the two remaining, 1201/3 were renumbered 1212/3.  The final one was withdrawn in 1934.  All were scrapped.

References 

 An Illustrated Review of Midland Locomotives Volume 3 - Tank Engines by R. J. Essery & D. Jenkinson 

0-4-4T locomotives
0690 Class
Railway locomotives introduced in 1869
Beyer, Peacock locomotives